Aštrioji Kirsna Manor (English: Spicy Kirsna Manor) is a former residential manor in Aštrioji Kirsna village, Lazdijai district, Alytus County, Lithuania.

References

Manor houses in Lithuania
Classicism architecture in Lithuania